Kopylki is a rural locality (a village) in Yesiplevskoye Rural Settlement, Kolchuginsky District, Vladimir Oblast, Russia. The population was 79 as of 2010.

Geography 
Barykino is the nearest rural locality.

References 

Rural localities in Kolchuginsky District